Cindy Gentry (born 14 October 1954) is an American former sport shooter who competed in the 2000 Summer Olympics.

References

1954 births
Living people
American female sport shooters
Trap and double trap shooters
Olympic shooters of the United States
Shooters at the 2000 Summer Olympics
Shooters at the 1999 Pan American Games
Pan American Games medalists in shooting
Pan American Games silver medalists for the United States
Medalists at the 1999 Pan American Games
21st-century American women
20th-century American women